The N. Williams House is an historic house at 7 Rawson Street (just northeast of its junction with Williams Street) in Uxbridge, Massachusetts.  The  story wood-frame house was built c. 1845–55, and is one of Uxbridge's finest Greek Revival houses.  It is five bays wide and four deep, with a pair of interior chimneys.  It has corner pilasters supporting a full and wide cornice.  Windows are set in moulded frames, the main entry is framed by sidelights, pilasters, and a cornice,  and there are secondary entrances one the east elevation, one with sidelights and a transom window, the other with a transom window.

On October 7, 1983, it was added to the National Register of Historic Places.

See also
National Register of Historic Places listings in Uxbridge, Massachusetts

References

External links
 N. Williams House MACRIS Listing

Houses completed in 1845
Houses in Uxbridge, Massachusetts
National Register of Historic Places in Uxbridge, Massachusetts
Houses on the National Register of Historic Places in Worcester County, Massachusetts